Psi, PSI or Ψ may refer to:

Alphabetic letters
 Psi (Greek) (Ψ, ψ), the 23rd letter of the Greek alphabet
 Psi (Cyrillic) (Ѱ, ѱ), letter of the early Cyrillic alphabet, adopted from Greek

Arts and entertainment
 "Psi" as an abbreviation for psionics

Comics
 Psi (comics), DC Comics character
 Psi Division, division in the Judge Dredd and 2000 AD series of comics
 Psi-Force, comic series
 Psi-Hawk, comic character
 Psi Lords, comic series

Music
 PSI (album), album by Pitchshifter (2002)
 Psi Com, 1980s rock band
 Psi Power,  song by rock group Hawkwind (1978)
 PSI Records, music record label
 Ψ CMX DVD, Finnish language video album by the band CMX
 Pitch Shifter Industries, acronym used by the British band Pitchshifter
 Logo used by the band Twenty One Pilots during their Scaled and Icy (2021) album era

Other uses in arts and entertainment
 Psi (TV series), Brazil
 Psi Corps, in the Babylon 5 fictional universe
 Psi Factor: Chronicles of the Paranormal, Canadian television series
 Psi-Ops: The Mindgate Conspiracy, 2004 video game

Organizations

Government and politics
 Italian Socialist Party (Partito Socialista Italiano), socialist and later social-democratic political party in Italy
 Italian Socialist Party (2007), social-democratic political party in Italy
 Indonesian Solidarity Party (Partai Solidaritas Indonesia)
 Indonesian Socialist Party (Partai Sosialis Indonesia)
 Proliferation Security Initiative, against weapons technology transfer
 Public Sector Information, as in:
 The 2003 EU Directive on the re-use of public sector information
 The UK Office of Public Sector Information (OPSI), formerly HMSO
 United States Senate Homeland Security Permanent Subcommittee on Investigations

Other organizations
 Paul Scherrer Institute, research institute in Villigen, Switzerland
 Pechersk School International, Kyiv, Ukraine
 Physics Society of Iran
 Planetary Science Institute, Tucson, Arizona, US
 Poetry Slam, Inc., promoting poetry
 Policy Studies Institute, UK research organization
 Population Services International, global health organization
 Professional Skills Institute, technical school in Maumee, Ohio, US
 Prudential Securities Incorporated, financial services company
 PSI Seminars, on awareness training
 Public Services International, trades unions federation
 Statisticians in the Pharmaceutical Industry

Parapsychology 

 Psi (parapsychology), psychic or paranormal phenomena
 Psi hit, parapsychological experimentation term
 Paranormal Site Investigators, in the UK

Science, technology, and mathematics

Biology and medicine

 PSI (prion), infectious protein in yeast
 Pandemic severity index, former US CDC influenza scale
 Photosystem I, protein complex involved in photosynthesis
 Pneumonia severity index
 Protein Structure Initiative, of the U.S. NIGMS

Computing
 Psi (instant messaging client), XMPP client program
 Potentially Shippable Increment, in the Scrum software development methodology
 Program-specific information, part of the MPEG transport stream protocol
 Pressure stall information, a Linux kernel patch for out of memory management

Economics
 PSI-20, Lisbon, Portugal stock market index
 Private sector involvement, in sovereign debt crisis resolution

Engineering
 "Yaw" angle, one of the Euler angles, denoted ψ in aerospace engineering
Present serviceability index, a pavement performance indicator introduced by AASHTO

Geography
 Psi Islands, in the Melchior Islands, Antarctica

Mathematics
 Chebyshev function
 Dedekind psi function
 Digamma function
 Polygamma functions
 Stream function, in two-dimensional flows
 Polar tangential angle of a curve
 Probability of ultimate ruin, in ruin theory
 Supergolden ratio
Reciprocal Fibonacci constant
 Population Stability Index (Kullback–Leibler divergence#Symmetrised divergence)

Physics and chemistry
 Pound per square inch, unit of pressure
 PSI (computational chemistry), software
 J/psi meson, subatomic particle
 Porous silicon
 Water potential, denoted Ψ, in physical chemistry, the potential energy of a water solution relative to pure water
 Wave function, denoted ψ, in quantum mechanics

Psychology

 Psychology or psychologist, denoted Ψ, used in the logo of various psychological associations
 Psi Chi, the National Honor Society in psychology
 Psi-theory, theory about the human mind, a cognitive architecture
 Psychiatric Solutions, Inc., corporation that owns psychiatric hospitals

Other uses
 Parasocial interaction, non-reciprocal interactions, as between a fanbase and a performer
 Permanent staff instructor, in the British Army
 Personalized System of Instruction
 Pollutant Standards Index, air pollution measure
 Pre-shipment inspection, method of quality control
 Presentence investigation report, investigation into the history of person convicted of a crime

See also
 Psy (disambiguation)
 Ps1 (disambiguation)